Caproni is an Italian surname.

People
Notable people include:

 Giorgio Caproni, Italian poet/critic/translator
 Giovanni Battista Caproni, 1st Count of Taliedo, Austrian-Italian aircraft designer
 Pietro Caproni, Italian-American statuary reproduction business owner
 Valerie E. Caproni, American jurist

Other
 Caproni, aircraft manufacturer founded by Giovanni Battista Caproni